Lawrence Albert Payton (March 2, 1938 – June 20, 1997) was an American tenor, songwriter, vocal arranger, musician, and record producer for the popular Motown quartet, the Four Tops. In 1997, at 59 years old, Payton died of liver cancer. Lawrence Payton was inducted into the Rock and Roll Hall of Fame in 1990, as a member of The Four Tops.

Biography
Payton and Renaldo Benson both attended a Northern High School in Detroit and met Levi Stubbs and Abdul Fakir at a school birthday party. The four teenagers began singing in 1953 as The Four Aims but later changed their name to the Four Tops. Although successful in the local area as a performance group, recording success eluded them until signing with the newly established Motown label in 1963. They then became one of the biggest recording acts of the sixties, charting more than two dozen hits through to the early eighties.
 
Payton is credited for the vocal arrangements and the "smooth seamless harmony" of the Tops' sound. He also sang lead on several songs such as the 1975 charting single "We All Gotta Stick Together", "Feel Free" (from the Catfish album) and "Love Feels Like Fire" & "Until You Love Someone"(from their Motown days), but he was often overshadowed as lead by the more popular Levi Stubbs. Stubbs praised Payton's contribution saying, "He did everything music wise, he had a terrific ear, he was a terrific guy, perfect pitch, he just knew what he was doing, he was a genius."

The original Four Tops enjoyed continued success as a headline performance act and remained together for 43 years until Payton's death in 1997, aged 59, from liver cancer in Southfield, Michigan. He was interred in Woodlawn Cemetery.

Payton had 11 children. One of his sons, Roquel, went on to sing with the Four Tops who still enjoy popularity today as an in-demand performance group, and still featuring Abdul Fakir.

Payton, as a member of the Four Tops, was inducted into the Rock and Roll Hall of Fame in 1990, received a star on the Hollywood Walk of Fame in 1997, was inducted into the Vocal Group Hall of Fame 1999, the Grammy Hall of Fame in 1998, received the Grammy Life Achievement Award in 2009, and was included in the Billboard Magazine Top 100 Recording Artists of All Time.

References

External links

1938 births
1997 deaths
American soul musicians
Four Tops members
American tenors
Deaths from liver cancer
Deaths from cancer in Michigan
Burials at Woodlawn Cemetery (Detroit)
Singers from Detroit
20th-century African-American male singers